William Newton (14 May 1893 – 29 April 1973) was an English professional footballer who played as a wing half.

References

1893 births
1973 deaths
People from Cramlington
Footballers from Northumberland
English footballers
Association football wing halves
Blyth Spartans A.F.C. players
Hartford Colliery F.C. players
Newcastle United F.C. players
Cardiff City F.C. players
Leicester City F.C. players
Grimsby Town F.C. players
Stockport County F.C. players
Hull City A.F.C. players
English Football League players
English football managers
Stockport County F.C. managers
English Football League managers